Johann Stumpf may refer to:
Johann Stumpf (writer), 16th-century Swiss writer
Johann Stumpf (engineer), 19th-century German engineer